The First Gallagher Ministry was the 11th ministry of the Government of the Australian Capital Territory, and was led by Labor Chief Minister Katy Gallagher and her deputy Andrew Barr. It was initially appointed as a transitional ministry on 16 May 2011 following the resignation of Jon Stanhope as Chief Minister and the subsequent election of Katy Gallagher as his replacement by the Australian Capital Territory Legislative Assembly. Gallagher had stated that, once the 2011-12 ACT Budget was passed by the assembly, she would appoint her deputy Andrew Barr to the Treasury portfolio in her place. This was implemented on 1 July 2011.

The new ministry was the first step in aligning ministerial appointments with the new structure of the ACT public service as recommended by the Hawke Review and adopted by the government. To this end, a number of ministerial appointments from the final Stanhope ministry had been consolidated or removed in the new appointments.

The final Stanhope ministry contained five ministers including Stanhope. With Stanhope resigning his ministerial posts, the cabinet was reduced to four ministers. This was increased back to five ministers following the appointment of Chris Bourke to the ministry on 23 November 2011.

The ministry was replaced by the Second Gallagher Ministry after the Labor government's re-election at the 2012 election.

First arrangement
Following Gallagher's election as Chief Minister, a new ministry of 4 ministers was appointed on 16 May 2011.

Transfer of Treasury portfolio
On 1 July 2011, Deputy Chief Minister Andrew Barr was appointed as Treasurer, as announced by Gallagher in May 2011. There were no other changes to ministerial appointments.

Second arrangement
On 23 November 2011, Chris Bourke was appointed to the Ministry, increasing the Ministry size back to 5. The arrangement lasted until 6 November 2012 when it was replaced by the Second Gallagher Ministry following the 2012 election.

References

Australian Capital Territory ministries
Australian Labor Party ministries in the Australian Capital Territory